MN1 is a gene found on human chromosome 22, with gene map locus 22q12.3-qter.  Its official full name is meningioma (disrupted in balanced translocation) 1 because it is disrupted by a balanced translocation (4;22) in a meningioma.

Function 
MN1 is a transcription coregulator that enhances or represses gene expression through direct or indirect interaction with the gene regulatory machinery. Reported interactions include the BAF (SWI/SNF) complex. RAC3 and p300.  MN1 can act as a coactivator of several transcription factors, including RAR/RXR and the vitamin D receptor. In AML, MN1 binds to genomic sites enriched for binding motifs of ETS factors as well as hematopoietic transcription factors such as RUNX1, GATA2, HOXA cluster genes, and MEIS1. MN1 induces a hematopoietic stem and progenitor gene expression program centered on HOXA cluster genes, particularly HOXA9 and MEIS1 via its interaction with the BAF complex

Clinical significance 

The translocation of MN1 was first reported in meningioma. A substantial percentage of primitive neuro-ectodermal tumors (PNET)  have MN1 translocations Several different partners were described, although in many cases no fusion partner was identified. MN1 transloations also occur in up to 2% of acute myeloid leukemia (AML) Described fusion partners include ETV6, STAT3 and FLI1. About 50% of fusions are out of frame and result in high expression of MN1 via enhancer hijacking.
High MN1 expression in AML and MDS is associated with poor outcome 

Mutations in this gene have been associated with cleft palate and an atypical form of rhombencephalosynapsis.

References

Further reading 

 
 
 
 
 
 
 
 
 
 
 
 
 

Transcription coregulators